The Ségala is a geographical region that straddles the border between the departments of Aveyron and Tarn, in the Occitanie region of southern France. It is known as the land of a hundred valleys- and traditionally grew the grain for all of Aveyron.

Geography
The Ségala is deeply valleyed region lying between 200 m and 800 m between the valley of the Viaur and the valley of the Aveyron. The valleys are deep and wooded, while the summits and the plateau are dominated by pasture land used for the raising of high-quality beef.

Geology
The underlying rocks are schists which leads to acid soils. The soils are light and thin, and were unproductive before the opening of the railway with the Viaduc du Viaur, which allowed lime to be brought in. Liming neutralised the soil opening it up to agriculture.

Villages in the Ségala

Tourist destinations and monuments 
 Balsac
 Rignac
 Ambialet
 Château de Belcastel
 Sauveterre-de-Rouergue

Bibliography 
  Au cœur du Ségala tarnais, in Revue du Tarn, n° 223, automne 2011 -in French

References

External links 
Le Ségala - in French
Le Ségala
www.cc-segalacarmausin.fr - in French

Geography of Aveyron
Geography of Tarn (department)